
Gmina Dziadowa Kłoda is a rural gmina (administrative district) in Oleśnica County, Lower Silesian Voivodeship, in south-western Poland. It is part of the Wrocław metropolitan area.

Neighbouring gminas
Gmina Dziadowa Kłoda is bordered by the gminas of Bierutów, Namysłów, Oleśnica, Perzów, Syców and Wilków.

Villages
The gmina contains the villages of Dalborowice, Dziadów Most, Dziadowa Kłoda, Gołębice, Gronowice, Lipka, Miłowice, Radzowice and Stradomia Dolna.

References

Dziadowa Kloda
Oleśnica County